F53 may refer to:
 F53 (classification), a disability sport classification
 English Electric Lightning F.53, a British fighter aircraft
 Franklin County Airport (Texas)
 , a Cunard ocean liner requisitioned for the Royal Navy
 , a J-class destroyer of the Royal Navy
 , a U-class destroyer of the Royal Navy